David Tuthill Farmstead is a historic farm complex located at Cutchogue in Suffolk County, New York. It includes the main house, a one-story wash house, a privy, a one-story shop, a one-story garage, and a large barn with attached water tower.  The original one story 1798 farmhouse has a five bay, center entrance, center chimney plan.  Attached to the original farmhouse is a two-story wing built about 1880.

It was added to the National Register of Historic Places in 1984.

References

Houses on the National Register of Historic Places in New York (state)
Houses completed in 1798
Houses in Suffolk County, New York
National Register of Historic Places in Suffolk County, New York